The capped seedeater has been split into two distinct species, and may refer to:

 Copper seedeater, Sporophila bouvreuil
 Pearly-bellied seedeater, Sporophila pileata